The Lundy–Fetterman School of Business is an American business school founded in 1983 and located in Buies Creek, North Carolina.  The Business School is one of eight colleges and schools that compose Campbell University.

Museum & Exhibit Hall
The Lundy-Fetterman Museum & Exhibit Hall is located in the Lundy–Fetterman School of Business Building on the main campus at Campbell University in Buies Creek, NC. The museum and exhibit has nearly 175 animals from the Burrows T. & Mabel L. Lundy Collection. The collection changes from time-to-time and is open year-round for students, area residents and visitors. The museum is home to a life-size brown bear, polar bear, zebra, leopard, gnu, impala, and rhinoceros, along with other animals.

Student Clubs

 Phi Beta Lambda
 Gilbert T. Stephenson Trust Club
 Business Leaders of Tomorrow
 Adam Smith Club
 Accounting Club
 Marketing Club
 Healthcare Management Club
 PGMSA-Professional Golf Management Student Association
 F.A.B. - Females Associated with Business

Notable alumni
 Bob Etheridge

Business School Programs
The Lundy–Fetterman School of Business is home to professional undergraduate and graduate programs.

Undergraduate programs
 Accounting
 Business Administration
 Economics
 Finance
 Healthcare Management
 International Business
 Marketing
 PGA Golf Management
 Trust & Wealth Management

Graduate programs
 Master of Business Administration
 Master of Trust & Wealth Management
 4+1 BBA+MBA Option
 Dual Degree/MBA Programs
 Graduate Certificate Programs
 Professional Development Courses

External links

Campbell University
Business schools in North Carolina
Educational institutions established in 1983
1983 establishments in North Carolina